The Ides of March is the 74th day in the Roman calendar, corresponding to 15 March. It was marked by several religious observances and was a deadline for settling debts in Rome. In 44 BC, it became notorious as the date of the assassination of Julius Caesar, which made the Ides of March a turning point in Roman history.

Ides
The Romans did not number each day of a month from the first to the last day. Instead, they counted back from three fixed points of the month: the Nones (the 5th or 7th, 8 days before the Ides), the Ides (the 13th for most months, but the 15th in March, May, July, and October), and the Kalends (1st of the following month). Originally the Ides were supposed to be determined by the full moon, reflecting the lunar origin of the Roman calendar. In the earliest calendar, the Ides of March would have been the first full moon of the new year.

Religious observances

The Ides of each month were sacred to Jupiter, the Romans' supreme deity.

In addition to the monthly sacrifice, the Ides of March was also the occasion of the Feast of Anna Perenna, a goddess of the year (Latin ) whose festival originally concluded the ceremonies of the new year. The day was enthusiastically celebrated among the common people with picnics, drinking, and revelry. One source from late antiquity also places the Mamuralia on the Ides of March. This observance, which has aspects of scapegoat or ancient Greek  ritual, involved beating an old man dressed in animal skins and perhaps driving him from the city. The ritual may have been a new year festival representing the expulsion of the old year.

In the later Imperial period, the Ides began a "holy week" of festivals celebrating Cybele and Attis, being the day  ("The Reed enters"), when Attis was born and found among the reeds of a Phrygian river. The day was formalized as part of the official Roman calendar under Claudius ( 54 AD). A three-day period of mourning followed, culminating with celebrating the rebirth of Attis on 25 March, the date of the vernal equinox on the Julian calendar.

Assassination of Caesar

In modern times, the Ides of March is best known as the date on which Julius Caesar was assassinated in 44 BC. Caesar was stabbed to death at a meeting of the Senate. As many as 60 conspirators, led by Brutus and Cassius, were involved. According to Plutarch, a seer had warned that harm would come to Caesar on the Ides of March. On his way to the Theatre of Pompey, where he would be assassinated, Caesar passed the seer and joked, "Well, the Ides of March are come", implying that the prophecy had not been fulfilled, to which the seer replied "Aye, they are come, but they are not gone." This meeting is famously dramatised in William Shakespeare's play Julius Caesar, when Caesar is warned by the soothsayer to "beware the Ides of March." The Roman biographer Suetonius identifies the "seer" as a haruspex named Spurinna.

Caesar's death was one of the final steps in the crisis of the Roman Republic and triggered, after his victory in Caesar's civil war, a series of further civil wars that would finally result in the rise to sole power of his adopted heir Octavian. In 27 BC, Octavian was raised to be emperor Augustus, and thus he finally terminated the Roman Republic. On the fourth anniversary of Caesar's death in 40 BC, after achieving a victory at the siege of Perugia, Octavian executed 300 senators and equites who had fought against him under Lucius Antonius, the brother of Mark Antony. The executions were one of a series of actions taken by Octavian to avenge Caesar's death. Suetonius and the historian Cassius Dio characterised the slaughter as a religious sacrifice, noting that it occurred on the Ides of March at the new altar to the deified Julius.

See also 
 The Ides of March, a novel by Thornton Wilder
 The Ides of March, a film by George Clooney, Beau Willimon and Grant Heslov
 The Ides of March, a music album by Myles Kennedy
 The Ides of March, an American musical group

References

External links
 Plutarch, The Parallel Lives, The Life of Julius Caesar
 Nicolaus of Damascus, Life of Augustus (translated by Clayton M. Hall)

Julius Caesar (play)
Assassination of Julius Caesar
March observances
Shakespearean phrases
Roman calendar
Jupiter (mythology)